Pendulum was an ambient house Australian group, active from 1994 to 1998. They are best known for their 1997 single "Coma".

Career
Pendulum formed in Melbourne, Australia in 1994 as a partnership between two Melbourne disc jockeys Julian Warner, Noel Mihailovic.

In early 1995, Pendulum released their debut single, "I Need You", which reached #1 on Melbourne's Kiss FM Dance chart within three weeks of its release and it received major club play across the country. The song was released in USA on Fade records and in the UK on Foreign Policy.

"I Need You" was followed by the single "Awesome Party/Insecurity". Vicious Vinyl described the song as "A mish-mash of beats, loops, funky guitar, banging synths and some crazy samples".
In July 1997, Pendulum released "Coma" which peaked at number 32 on the ARIA Charts and featured in the Triple J Hottest 100, 1997. At the ARIA Music Awards of 1997, "Coma" won ARIA Award for Best Dance Release. The group released an album titled 3 Knocks which failed to chart, despite receiving positive from Mixmag, DJ and Rolling Stone. The group disbanded in 1998 to pursue other interests.

Discography

Albums

Singles

Awards and nominations

ARIA Awards

References

ARIA Award winners
Australian house music groups
Musical groups established in 1994
Musical groups disestablished in 1998